School for Randle is a 1949 British comedy film directed by John E. Blakeley and starring Frank Randle, Dan Young and Alec Pleon. The plot concerns a school caretaker who turns out to be the father of one of the pupils. When she runs away from home to pursue a career on the stage, he goes to persuade her to come back to school. The title is a reference to the Richard Brinsley Sheridan play The School for Scandal. It was made at the Manchester Studios, and was one of a string of cheaply made and profitable films starring Randle during the era.

Plot
Former Music-Hall act 'Flatfoot' Mason (Frank Randle) is caretaker at a school where one of the pupils, and unbeknownst to her, is his daughter, Betty (Terry Randall); who was put up for adoption when his wife died. She is now a teenager and this causes concern, as the staff feel 'Flatfoot' is being over attentive to her. Told to pay her less attention, 'Flatfoot' reluctantly obeys, but Betty thinks he's rejecting her and decides to run away to make her name in show business. Along with fellow caretakers (Dan Young and Alec Pleon), 'Flatfoot' tracks her down to a seedy cabaret club. In disguise as a Chinese acrobatic troupe, "The Three Who Flungs", 'Flatfoot' and friends attempt to persuade Betty to come home.

Cast
 Frank Randle as Flatfoot Mason
 Dan Young as Clarence
 Alec Pleon as Blockhead
 Terry Randall as Betty Andrews
 Hilda Bayley as Mrs. Andrews
 Frederick Bradshaw as Mr. Andrews
 Jimmy Clitheroe as Jimmy
 Maudie Edwards as Bella Donna
 John Singer as Ted Parker
 Elsa Tee as Miss Weston

References

External links

1949 films
British comedy films
1949 comedy films
Films directed by John E. Blakeley
Films set in England
British black-and-white films
Films shot in Greater Manchester
1940s English-language films
1940s British films